Littoraria variegata is a species of sea snail, a marine gastropod mollusk in the family Littorinidae, the winkles or periwinkles.

Description

Distribution

References

 Reid, D.G., Dyal, P. & Williams, S.T. (2009) Global diversification of mangrove fauna: a molecular phylogeny of Littoraria (Gastropoda: Littorinidae). Molecular Phylogenetics and Evolution

Littorinidae
Gastropods described in 1852